Richard McCarty may refer to:

Richard C. McCarty (born 1947), American psychologist and academic
Richard E. McCarty, American biologist
Richard McCarty (politician) (1780–1844), United States Representative from New York

See also
Rick McCarty, American college baseball coach